Kangan may refer to:

Places in India 
 Kangan, Jammu and Kashmir, a town
 Kangan Heri, a village in Delhi

Places in Iran 
 Kangan County in Bushehr Province
 Bandar Kangan, a city in Bushehr Province
 Kangan, Hormozgan, a village in Hormozgan Province
 Kangan-e Nasri, a village in Hormozgan Province
 Kangan Rural District, in Hormozgan Province
 Kangan, South Khorasan, a village in South Khorasan
 Kangan Jan, a village in Fars Province
 Kangan gas field in Fars Province

Other uses 
 Kangan (film), a 1971 Indian Hindi language film
 Kangan Institute, an educational institute in Australia
 Kangan Giin (1217–1300), Japanese Buddhist monk
 A type of bangle in South Asia
 Kangan, a fictional country in the novel Anthills of the Savannah by Chinua Achebe

See also 
 Kagan (disambiguation)
 Kaghan (disambiguation) (including places in Pakistan)